Thelypodium laxiflorum, the droopflower thelypody, is a plant species native to the southwestern United States. It has been reported from Utah, western Colorado, southern Nevada, northwestern Arizona, and northwestern New Mexico.

Thelypodium laxiflorum is a glabrous perennial. It has both basal and cauline (stem) leaves. Flowers are white, rarely lavender, born in cymes. Fruits are long and narrow, visibly constricted between the seeds.

References

laxiflorum
Flora of Colorado
Flora of Nevada
Flora of Utah
Flora of Arizona
Flora of New Mexico
Flora without expected TNC conservation status